The Movement for the National Independence of Angola (in Portuguese: Movimento para a Independência Nacional de Angola) was a political party in Angola, formed in 1958. MINA later merged with other parties to form the Popular Movement for the Liberation of Angola (MPLA).

Defunct political parties in Angola
MPLA
Political parties established in 1958
1958 establishments in Angola
Political parties with year of disestablishment missing